Tétange is a town in the commune of Kayl, in south-western Luxembourg.  , the town has a population of 2,813. Schlager singer Camillo Felgen and Olympic cyclist Roger Thull were born here.

References

Kayl
Towns in Luxembourg